William Baillie Skene (24 April 1838 – 10 June 1911) was a British academic and political agent.

The second son of Patrick Skene, of Pitlaw House, Fife, Scotland, William Baillie Skeene was born in Edinburgh in 1838. Educated at Harrow School and Corpus Christi College, Oxford, where he matriculated as an exhibitioner in 1856, he took first-class honours in classical moderations and was elected to a fellowship of All Souls College, Oxford in 1864. He was called to the bar at Lincoln's Inn in 1863, and practiced at the bar for a few years before returning to All Souls as bursar in 1869. As bursar, he guided the college through a period of substantial change, brought about by reforms to the administration of the University and of its colleges.

Skene married Lorina Liddell, eldest daughter of Henry Liddell, in 1874, vacating his fellowship by his marriage. In 1876, he became Principal Agent of the Conservative Party, resigning in 1880. In 1886, he became acting treasurer of Christ Church, Oxford, and he remained there as a student (fellow) and treasurer until his resignation in 1910, when he returned to his Scottish home, Pitlour.

Skene was a justice of the peace for Fife and Kinross and a deputy lieutenant for Fife.

Works 

 Handbook of Certain Acts Affecting the Universities of Oxford and Cambridge and the Colleges Therein in the Sale, Acquisition and Administration of Property (Sweet & Maxwell, 1898)

References 

1838 births
1911 deaths
Conservative Party (UK) officials
People educated at Harrow School
Alumni of Corpus Christi College, Oxford
Fellows of All Souls College, Oxford
Members of Lincoln's Inn
Fellows of Christ Church, Oxford
Scottish justices of the peace
Deputy Lieutenants of Fife